Sterreria is a genus of worms belonging to the family Nemertodermatidae.

The species of this genus are found in North Europe.

Species:

Sterreria boucheti 
Sterreria lundini 
Sterreria martindalei 
Sterreria monolithes 
Sterreria papuensis 
Sterreria psammicola 
Sterreria rubra 
Sterreria variabilis 
Sterreria ylvae

References

Acoelomorphs